Muanenguba lakes are a pair of caldera lakes on Mount Manengouba straddling the border of the Southwest and Littoral regions in Cameroon.

References

External links
Fishing for Signs of Evolution in Mysterious Volcanic Lakes, National Geographic

Lakes of Cameroon
Southwest Region (Cameroon)
Littoral Region (Cameroon)